The discography of Bad Religion, an American Punk Rock band, consists of 17 studio albums, two live albums, four compilation albums, one box set, two extended plays (EPs), 29 singles, five video albums and 25 music videos. Formed in Los Angeles, California in 1980, the band originally featured vocalist Greg Graffin, guitarist Brett Gurewitz, bassist Jay Bentley and drummer Jay Ziskrout, who released their self-titled debut EP in February 1981 on Gurewitz's label Epitaph Records. Pete Finestone replaced Ziskrout before the release of the band's full-length debut album How Could Hell Be Any Worse? in 1982. The following year's Into the Unknown featured bassist Paul Dedona and drummer Davy Goldman, before Bentley and Finestone returned to the band and Greg Hetson joined as second guitarist.

After a brief hiatus, Bad Religion returned with three albums in three years – Suffer in 1988, No Control in 1989 and Against the Grain in 1990 – before Finestone left again and was replaced by Bobby Schayer. 1992's Generator charted in the top 50 in Germany, while it's 1993 follow-up Recipe for Hate reached the top 40. After signing with major label Atlantic Records, Bad Religion released its final album with Gurewitz before his departure, Stranger than Fiction. The album was the band's first commercial success, reaching number 87 on the Billboard 200, and receiving gold certifications from the Recording Industry Association of America (RIAA) and Music Canada. Three singles from the album reached the Billboard Alternative Songs (then the Hot Modern Rock Tracks chart) top 40.

After adding Brian Baker as Gurewitz's replacement, the band released three more albums on Atlantic – The Gray Race (1996), No Substance (1998) and The New America (2000) – all of which reached the Billboard 200 top 100. Gurewitz returned and Brooks Wackerman replaced Schayer in 2001, with this lineup's first album The Process of Belief (2002) being the band's first to reach the US top 50. The Empire Strikes First (2004) reached the top 40, while the single "Los Angeles Is Burning" reached number 40 on the Alternative Songs chart and number 3 on the UK Rock & Metal Singles Chart. New Maps of Hell (2007) and The Dissent of Man (2010) both reached number 35, while True North (2013) peaked at number 19. Also in 2013, the band released an EP of Christmas music titled Christmas Songs that reached number 101 on the Billboard 200. Bad Religion did not release another full-length studio album, Age of Unreason, until 2019.

Albums

Studio albums

Live albums

Compilations

Box sets

Extended plays

Singles

Videos

Video albums

Music videos

References

External links
Bad Religion official website

Discography
Punk rock group discographies
Discographies of American artists